Finger Man is a 1955 American crime film noir directed by Harold D. Schuster starring Frank Lovejoy, Forrest Tucker and Peggie Castle .

Plot
Ex-convict Casey Martin (Lovejoy) is caught heisting a truck shipment. After he discovers the depths of alcoholism his sister, Lucille, has fallen to after working for mobster Dutch Becker (Tucker), Casey accepts the deal police have offered him. He goes to work undercover to nail Dutch and his gang; if he survives and is successful, Casey will receive immunity from prosecution.

Gladys Baker (Castle) worked for Dutch for a long time.  She has been an associate of Casey's as well and is falling for him.  She tells him about her relationship with the mob man and casts her lot with Casey; this gets her murdered by Dutch's sadistic chief henchman Lou Terpe (Carey). In the end Casey brings down the gang and, while he is allowed his freedom, he walks off into a still uncertain future.

Cast
 Frank Lovejoy as Casey Martin
 Forrest Tucker as Dutch Becker
 Peggie Castle as Gladys Baker 
 Timothy Carey as Lou Terpe 
 John Cliff as Johnny Cooper 
 William F. Leicester as Jim Rogers (as William Leicester)
 Glen Gordon as Carlos Armor (as Glenn Gordon)
 John Close as 'Big' Walters 
 Hugh Sanders as Mr. Burns 
 Evelyn Eaton as Lucille Martin 
 Charles Maxwell as Fred Amory 
 Dorothy Green

See also
List of American films of 1955

References

External links
 
 
 

1955 films
1955 crime drama films
American crime thriller films
American black-and-white films
1950s English-language films
Film noir
American crime drama films
Films directed by Harold D. Schuster
Films scored by Paul Dunlap
1950s American films